Maurice "Mauri" Rose (May 26, 1906 – January 1, 1981) was an American racecar driver.

He started from the pole position driving a Maserati in the 1941 Indianapolis 500, but spark plug problems put him out of the race after sixty laps. He then took over the Wetteroth/Offenhauser car being driven by Floyd Davis that had started in 17th place. Rose went on to win. In 1947 and 1948, Rose captured back-to-back Indy 500s driving one of the Deidt/Offenhauser Blue Crown Spark Plug Specials, owned and prepared by veteran driver/car owner Lou Moore.

Late in the 1947 race, Rose found himself lying second to his rookie teammate, Bill Holland, when both were given a sign reading "EZY" from pit lane.  Holland reduced speed, but Rose ignored the sign and continued on.  Rose closed on Holland and to his amazement, Holland gave way without a battle and even gave Rose a friendly wave as he went past on his way to victory.  But Holland thought he had more than a lap lead on Rose, instead of just a few seconds.  Holland was furious afterward.

In 1949, with Holland leading and Rose again running second late in the race, Rose set out to overtake his now-veteran teammate. Rose again ignored car owner Lou Moore's "EZ" signs from the pits and continued to push in pursuit of Holland.  This time, Rose's car broke while Holland cruised home to victory—and Moore fired Rose on the spot after the race for disobeying team orders.

Mauri Rose made his fifteenth and final Indianapolis 500 start in the 1951 race. Knocked out from an accident after 126 laps, the forty-five-year-old Rose retired to a home in California. For the 1967 race, officials of the Indianapolis Motor Speedway invited him to drive the Chevrolet Camaro Pace Car.

While his career in racing was filled with success, Rose considered his most important accomplishment to be his invention of a device that made it possible for amputees to drive an automobile.

Complete AAA Championship Car results

Indianapolis 500 results

Complete Formula One World Championship results
(key) (Races in bold indicate pole position, races in italics indicate fastest lap)

World Championship career summary
The Indianapolis 500 was part of the FIA World Championship from 1950 through 1960. Drivers competing at Indy during those years were credited with World Championship points and participation. Mauri Rose participated in 2 World Championship races. He finished on the podium once and scored 4 World Championship points.

Awards
Rose was inducted into the Indianapolis Motor Speedway Hall of Fame in 1967.
In 1994, he was posthumously inducted into the International Motorsports Hall of Fame.
He was inducted in the Motorsports Hall of Fame of America in 1996.
In 2007 Rose, who was Jewish, was inducted into the International Jewish Sports Hall of Fame.

See also
List of select Jewish racing drivers

References

External links
The Greatest 33

1906 births
1981 deaths
20th-century American inventors
Champ Car champions
Indianapolis 500 drivers
Indianapolis 500 polesitters
Indianapolis 500 winners
International Motorsports Hall of Fame inductees
Jewish American sportspeople
Sportspeople from Columbus, Ohio
Racing drivers from Columbus, Ohio
Racing drivers from Ohio
AAA Championship Car drivers
20th-century American Jews